Magdala was an ancient city on the shore of the Sea of Galilee believed to be the birthplace of Mary Magdalene.

Magdala may also refer to:

Places
Al-Majdal, Tiberias, a Palestinian Arab village on the site of ancient Magdala, depopulated in 1948
Magdala (woreda), a district of Amhara Region, Ethiopia, that includes Amba Mariam
Magdala, Ethiopia, modern Amba Mariam, a former capital of Abyssinia and site of the Battle of Magdala
Magdala, Germany, a town in Thuringia, Germany
Magdala, South Australia, a locality north of Adelaide

Other uses
Battle of Magdala, fought in April 1868 between British and Abyssinian forces
HMS Magdala (1870), a ship named after the Battle of Magdala
Magdala (ensemble), an early music ensemble founded by musicologist David Skinner
The Magdala, a public house in Hampstead, London

See also
Dūr-Katlimmu in Ancient Assyria, then Magdalu/Magdala in Babylonia, modern Tell Sheikh Hamad in Syria
Magdalu in Egypt
Port of Magdalla in India